Bethel Church is an American non-denominational neo-charismatic megachurch in Redding, California with over 11,000 members. The church was established in 1952, and is currently led by Bill Johnson. Bethel has its own music labels, Bethel Music and Jesus Culture ministries, which have gained popularity for contemporary worship music. The church runs the Bethel School of Supernatural Ministry with over 2,000 students annually. Senior church leaders have been supporters of socially conservative politics.

History

Early history and path to non-denominationalism
Robert Doherty began the church in 1952, and the congregation was an affiliate of the Assemblies of God beginning in 1954. 

In 1984, Raymond Larson became the senior pastor, and during his 11-year tenure, Bethel Church grew to over 2200 members.

One year prior to joining Bethel in 1995, Johnson visited the revival meetings of the Toronto Blessing where he made the promise to God that he would make "the outpouring of the Holy Spirit" the sole purpose of his existence, a focus which he brought to Bethel Church. The church lost 1,000 members over Johnson's vision after he joined, but has since seen considerable growth. 

In February 1996, the congregation invited Bill Johnson from Weaverville, California, to lead the church. Johnson, the son of former pastor Earl Johnson, only had one stipulation before he was voted in: that the message would always be about revival, with an emphasis on God's supernatural presence, which the leadership unanimously approved. 

The Williams Brothers that killed Gary Matson and Winfield Mowder attended this church as children. 

In November 2005, the membership of Bethel Church voted unanimously to withdraw the church's affiliation with the Assemblies of God, and become a non-denominational church. However, the Assemblies of God's bylaws required Bethel to invite the leadership of the Northern California-Nevada District to speak to the congregation. 

On January 15, 2006, Bethel's membership voted to rescind the withdrawal and invited the district leadership to Redding. The district leadership met with the congregation on January 17, but the result was a near-unanimous vote to withdraw. In a letter, Johnson points out that this action was "...not a reaction to conflict but a response to a call... we feel called to create a network that helps other networks thrive – to be one of many ongoing catalysts in this continuing revival. Our call feels unique enough theologically and practically from the call on the Assemblies of God that this change is appropriate."

In 2015, Bethel Church issued a press release regarding the Colorado Springs Tragedy in which 3 people including the shooter died. The shooter's father is Thomas Harpham who attended Bethel Church at the time. 

As of 2016, Bethel Church had 8,684 attendees a week. 

In 2018, as per its annual report, Bethel had 11,233 people that called "Bethel Redding home".

Prayer for resurrection
Bethel Church gained national press coverage in December 2019 over a campaign to pray for the resurrection of a worship leader's deceased two-year-old daughter. The mother, Kalley Heiligenthal, a recording artist with Bethel Music and worship leader at the church, posted to Instagram asking for her large social media following to pray that her daughter Olive Alayne would be raised from the dead. This spawned a global hashtag with thousands of posts. The church hosted a prayer service for the cause, where the young adult pastor at Bethel led a prayer. In a public statement, the church said that physical resurrection was possible in modern times, and in a video addressing critics, senior pastor Bill Johnson said that there was a biblical precedent for this belief, and that Jesus commanded his disciples to raise the dead. The prayer efforts concluded six days after the passing, when the church put out a press release that the family would transition towards a memorial service. During the prayer efforts, a GoFundMe page was set up that raised over $74,500 by January 2020. Two researchers, Arlene Sánchez-Walsh, professor of religious studies at Azusa Pacific University, and Richard Flory, senior director of research at the University of Southern California, were quoted saying that these events were more common among African charismatics and Pentecostals, than their American counterparts, with Sánchez-Walsh saying she was surprised by it.

COVID-19 pandemic
In 2020, during the coronavirus pandemic, Bethel Church closed the healing rooms and moved healing operations of 700 people online. The church also suspended faith healings at hospitals. The church's official position was to follow the recommendations of health officials, and that "wisdom, modern medicine, and faith are meant to work together", but the church simultaneously upheld belief in God's ability to heal supernaturally. Some in the church community held differing views. Kevin Dedmon, a longtime teacher of the Bethel School of Supernatural Ministry stated that "there is no way this thing can live in the presence of God", and "we declare no fear and we declare healing in Jesus' name." Later in the year, Chuck Parry, the director of Bethel's healing rooms claimed that numerous people were healed from COVID-19 through the church's remote Zoom calls, alongside other claimed miracles, such as healing cancer, blindness, and waking people up from comas. By October 2020, Shasta County had the highest COVID-19 case rate in California and Bethel School of Supernatural Ministry in Redding asked its entire 1,600-person student body to self-quarantine as the number of coronavirus cases among students and staff rose to 137 since classes started a month previously.

In October 2020, Bethel's senior leader Beni Johnson was criticized after posting a video in which she mocked wearing masks while shopping on the California coast, saying "If you'll do the scientific research, these masks are worthless and they're people's security blankets. We won't be shopping and giving them any money because you have to wear a stupid freaking mask that doesn't work". When asked about the video, Shasta Community Health Center CEO Dean Germano said it was disconcerting to see leaders disavowing masks. Beni Johnson later apologized for "the insensitivity and making light of this pandemic" while maintaining that she still questions the importance of a mask, but that she wears one when the situation requires it.

Beliefs and practices 
Bethel Church focuses on miracles. It teaches that all miracles described in the Bible can be performed by believers today and happen regularly, including faith healing of everything from curing cancer to regrowing limbs, raising the dead, speaking in tongues, casting out demons and prophecy. Services may have congregants laughing uncontrollably, lying on the floor, shaking, staggering, screaming, and dancing, which they teach are signs of being filled with the Holy Spirit. Leaders claim to have witnessed angels appearing and "balls of electricity" that throw people into the air.

One of the most well-known phenomena is a cloud of what is claimed to be gold dust or gold glitter that has been seen falling from the roof of the auditorium. The church has uploaded videos to its YouTube channel, calling it a "glory cloud".

Many, like Gary Hal Graff, feel that the Bethel-produced book The Physics of Heaven is out of line with the teachings of scripture. One Bethel leader (Kris Vallotton) says it is "a foretaste of things to come". The book also states, "It wasn't that I wanted to become a New Ager. I just wanted to find out if maybe they had discovered some truths the churches hadn't."

Senior pastor Bill Johnson is referred to as an apostle by his followers. Some, including sociology professor Brad Christerson at Biola University and Richard Flory, a sociologist at the University of Southern California, have identified the church and Johnson as part of the New Apostolic Reformation (NAR), or Independent Network Charismatic Christianity. The NAR is an evangelical movement that seeks to take over "seven mountains of culture", including business, government, and media, to prompt the return of Jesus. Bill Johnson himself, however, said in an interview with Christianity Today that the church has no official ties with the movement, and that he is "not completely clear on what it is."

Church ministries 

Bethel Church has set up ministries in conjunction to the needs of its growing congregation within Redding, California. These ministries span a range of different sections for public service, internal structure, and even products and brands. One of the more well known of these ministries is Bethel Music due to the popularity of its music domestically and worldwide.

Bethel School of Supernatural Ministry
In the fall of 1998, Bethel Church began Bethel School of Supernatural Ministry, under the direction of Kris Vallotton, Bethel's senior associate pastor. The school trains its students in the supernatural and miracles, such as faith healing, in order that they may become revivalists. The normal program is one academic year and students have the opportunity to return for a second and third year. Approximately 15% of the students stay for the full three years. The school was founded with 36 students, and has grown to more than 2,400 students from over 70 countries in 2019. They are an unaccredited program and do not offer a degree or credits but a certificate. The school has gotten the nickname "Christian Hogwarts" among students because of its focus on the supernatural.

BSSM now has more than 10,000 alumni. In 2016–17, an extensive survey on alumni was carried out by Eido Research by alumni of the program. From a representative sample from all years of graduation since 1999, the survey found that 97% of graduates are still "confident in their faith", and that 90% attend a church service at least monthly. Likewise, graduates reported seeing at least 35,000 salvations since 1999, and 50,000 physical healings over the previous year. The report also showed that BSSM graduates have a divorce rate that is four times lower than the American Christian average.

The school's claims of prophetic and miraculous abilities came under scrutiny when the predicted resurrection of "Baby Olive," the daughter of their worship leader, did not come to pass, and the prediction that Donald Trump would win reelection and be in office eight straight years did not occur. The school also made questionable claims that the gold dust from the golden street in Heaven, the shekinah glory of God, and angel feathers, appear in services.

Student activities in Redding 
As a part of the student's education, they get assignments, such as to find strangers in Redding to heal. News articles report that students seek out people in wheelchairs and crutches to pray for in grocery stores and parking lots. Reportedly, the students are banned from prophesying to tourists around the Sundial Bridge after incidents and they have similarly been kicked out of local stores. Another regular practice is "treasure hunts", where they believe God gives them clues that match people they are to find and attempt to heal or prophesy to.

2008 lawsuit over attempted faith healing 

In 2008 a man fell down a  cliff in Redding after drinking with a group at the top. The two others that were with him, including one student at the Bethel School of Supernatural Ministry, believed he was dead and tried to find him for six hours in order to raise him back to life, rather than calling 9-1-1. The man survived, but was paralyzed from the fall, and later unsuccessfully sued the student in the group. The incident is often brought up as a criticism of the church's teachings, which includes that believers may raise people from the dead with prayer.

Grave soaking 
The school garnered criticism for a practice among some students termed "grave soaking" or "grave sucking", where they would lie on the graves of deceased revivalists in the belief that they would absorb the deceased's anointing from God. The school would visit such graves for inspiration and prayer, and there the practice developed among students from an interpretation of the Biblical story of the prophet Elisha. In the Bible, a dead man was put in the grave of Elisha, and when the man's corpse touched the dead bones of Elisha, he was revived. This was interpreted to mean that the same power, or anointing, laid in the graves of later revivalists, and thus the students sought it by laying on their graves. The leadership of the church never endorsed the practice but did not immediately shut it down. In an interview, one of its leaders, Banning Liebscher, stated that Bill Johnson and the rest of the leadership responded in this way because Johnson "doesn't want to shut down those that are really seeking and those that are really trying to press in for more of God". At the same time, Liebscher said it was possible that revivalist's graves had the same anointing, but called the practice "weird." He further stated that he believed the criticism the church got over this, and other practices such as students attempting to walk through walls, actually stemmed from disagreements on charismatic theology.

Some critics allege that Bethel leaders, including senior pastor Beni Johnson, have in fact practiced and promoted grave soaking. Beni Johnson posted photos to Twitter and Instagram of herself laying atop of or hugging the graves of Christians such as C.S. Lewis. The posts were later removed. Among these critics are The Gospel Coalition and Baptist apologetics blog Pulpit & Pen.

Bethel Music

Bethel Music is an American record label and publishing company associated with Bethel Church, led by Bill Johnson's son Brian Johnson. Its music was among the most played contemporary worship music in American churches in 2019 and its albums have reached the Billboard 200 multiple times.  Bethel Music has many songs with tens of millions of views on YouTube, and three with over 100 million views as of 2023 (Reckless Love, No Longer Slaves, Way Maker). The live performances of its songs are characterized by extended duration with much repetition and emotion.

Jesus Culture

Bethel Church is responsible for the formation of the Jesus Culture youth outreach ministry. Jesus Culture Ministry hosts conferences and operates a record label, Jesus Culture Music, to share its message and spread worship. They remain committed to Bethel Church, but were sent out by Bethel in 2012 to plant a church in Sacramento, California.

CHANGED Movement
The CHANGED Movement was started by Bethel pastors Elizabeth Woning and Ken Williams in 2019 for people who "once identified as LGBTQ+ and through encounters with the love of Jesus, have experienced His freedom in their lives" and is led by the Equipped to Love ministry at Bethel. Both Woning and Williams used to identify as homosexual. Woning claims she changed after 18 months when "the Lord was able to displace my sense of belonging as a lesbian with my sense of belonging as a daughter of God". Williams credits his change to undergoing five years of weekly therapy which he claims resolved his same-sex attraction as well as addiction to masturbation and pornography.

Bethel does not financially support the CHANGED Movement but does pay the salaries of the pastors, promote it, and house them in the offices of another one of Bethel's ministries. In August 2019, they received attention when Bethel promoted CHANGED through a series of Instagram posts, which was criticized by The Trevor Project and Q Christian Fellowship, among others. As a response to this criticism, Bethel Church said that "The message of CHANGED has never been ‘All Must Change’" and "For those of you who feel fulfilled and happy as you are, we love you!"

CHANGED uses the term "once gay", and some have noted similarities with the ex-gay movement. CHANGED's slogan is "Changed Is Possible", whereas the now-defunct Exodus International had the slogan "Change is possible". The Bethel pastors behind CHANGED do not use the term "conversion therapy", although they have spoken against legislation that would restrict or ban conversion therapy, such as the Equality Act.

In June 2021, CHANGED participated in Freedom March in Washington DC, an event for "formerly LGBT-identifying people who share testimonies of how Jesus transformed their lives" which was attended by around 200 people. On that occasion CHANGED Movement spoke with congressional staffers about their concerns with the pending legislation (Equality Act).

Influence on Redding 
Redding is a small city in northern California with about 90,000 residents. Bethel has grown to over 10 percent of the Redding population and with this growth, the church's influence in the city has increased, with a mixed reception. The church has brought in many young people for the school that clean the streets and do pro bono work. Many of the students have stayed afterwards and some have started businesses. When the civic auditorium was about to close for financial reasons in 2011, the church started leasing it and put in $1 million for repairs, and now use it for the church's Supernatural school on weekdays, while still letting it host the usual events on weekends. Bethel donated $500,000 to the city of Redding's police in April 2017, and later led a campaign to raise $740,000 to fund the salaries of four police officers. In 2018, a direct flight from Redding to Los Angeles was opened, and Bethel Church used its business relationship with the airline as leverage and committed $450,000 to a revenue guarantee fund needed to operate the line.

However, some Redding residents are worried by the influence Bethel church has on the city. One of their main worries is the belief held by Bethel, the Seven Mountains Mandate, that Christians must influence seven "mountains", including government, media, business and education, in order for Jesus to return to earth. One such alleged instance of influence was the donation to the police force. The offer to donate caused controversy as some in the community thought the church was trying to pay off the city for future building permits, an assertion Pastor Kris Vallotton refuted at a city council meeting. The city ultimately voted to receive the donation. Seven months after receiving the donation, Redding City Council unanimously approved a $96 million new Bethel campus, despite dozens of formally submitted citizen concerns. The city councilperson who is a member of Bethel recused herself from voting. Another instance was when they advertised a seminar for public and private school teachers that mentioned "God wants to come to your school with His presence, His peace and His strategies". A group connected to the church later opened a public charter school, which, according to a teacher job ad, has a "Kingdom culture and all Bethel-connected board of directors and principal".

Politics

Presidency of Donald Trump 
In 2016, senior pastor Bill Johnson outlined why he voted for Donald Trump in a Facebook post, where he criticized abortion, open borders, the welfare system, same-sex marriage, socialism, political correctness, and globalization, all as contrary to God's will. His wife and senior pastor, Beni Johnson, has also supported Trump.

The church continued to be supportive of Trump during his presidency. Bethel Music leaders Brian Johnson, Jenn Johnson, and Sean Feucht were among the worship leaders who visited Trump in the Oval Office, where they prayed for him and sang worship music.

During the impeachment process of Trump, senior associate leader Kris Vallotton prophesied during a sermon, 10 days before the impeachment started, that God would end the process, stating "the Lord is gonna step into the impeachment process. I mean I know it's gonna happen". He went on to say that he believed God would give Trump another term. But according to Vallotton, this was "not about politics", rather it was a prophetic word. He claimed to have prophesied that Obama would win and that he on a biblical basis loved and prayed for Obama as he said Christians are called to do for their leaders.

Bethel leaders Brian Johnson, Jenn Johnson, and Kris Vallotton were among the signers of the letter from evangelical leaders critical of Christianity Today's editorial that called for Trump to be removed from office.

Opposition to restrictions on conversion therapy 
In 2018, the church publicly opposed three bills in the California state legislature that would have restricted conversion therapy. The church, whose position is that "same-sex sexual behavior is unhealthful", believed the bills would restrict their ministry. Their opposition included a released statement, letters to legislators and encouragement of congregants to contact legislators through a sermon titled "What Would Jesus Do in a PC World?" by Kris Vallotton and tweets, also by Vallotton, that specifically addressed those that had "come out of homosexuality". Vallotton later retracted his sermon, but stood by his opposition.

In April 2021 Bethel's senior associate leader - Kris Vallotton - spoke against the Equality Act with Elizabeth Woning, the co-founder of the CHANGED Movement, encouraging people to contact their senators and voice their opposition to the bill.

Sean Feucht for Congress 
In September 2019, Bethel worship leader Sean Feucht announced he was running for Congress as a Republican on a socially conservative platform. His announcement video featured a Bethel Music song with the lyrics "We won't stop singing until the whole world looks like heaven". He placed third in the March 3, 2020, non-partisan primary behind Democrat John Garamendi and Republican Tamika Hamilton.

Media coverage 
There have been many articles written about Bethel and its ministry, including in Christianity Today, Buzzfeed News, The Daily Beast, The Washington Post, the Redding Record Searchlight, and Charisma magazine. The church and Bill Johnson have been featured in video segments by the Christian Broadcasting Network (CBN) and the Trinity Broadcasting Network (TBN).

References

External links 
 

Evangelical megachurches in the United States
Megachurches in California
Pentecostal churches in California
Christian organizations established in 1952
Churches in Shasta County, California
Charismatic and Pentecostal organizations
Buildings and structures in Redding, California
Redding, California
1952 establishments in California